The following species in the flowering plant genus Myrcia are accepted by Plants of the World Online. Workers in the field have perceived this genus as difficult to study and its species to be difficult to identify, in part due to the sheer number of species and the lack of congruence between subclades erected on the basis of morphology and subclades revealed by molecular methods.

Myrcia abbotiana 
Myrcia abrantea 
Myrcia acevedoi 
Myrcia acunae 
Myrcia acutissima 
Myrcia adenophylla 
Myrcia adulterina 
Myrcia adunca 
Myrcia aegiphylloides 
Myrcia aequatoriensis 
Myrcia aerisea 
Myrcia aethusa 
Myrcia alatiramea 
Myrcia albescens 
Myrcia albicans 
Myrcia albidotomentosa 
Myrcia albobrunnea 
Myrcia albotomentosa 
Myrcia aliena 
Myrcia almasensis 
Myrcia altera 
Myrcia altomontana 
Myrcia amanana 
Myrcia amapensis 
Myrcia amarulenta 
Myrcia amazonica 
Myrcia ambivalens 
Myrcia amoena 
Myrcia amplexicaulis 
Myrcia ampliflora 
Myrcia amplifolia 
Myrcia amshoffae 
Myrcia anacardiifolia 
Myrcia anacletoi 
Myrcia anceps 
Myrcia anguerana 
Myrcia angusta 
Myrcia anomala 
Myrcia antillana 
Myrcia antioquensis 
Myrcia antonia 
Myrcia apicata 
Myrcia apiocarpa 
Myrcia apoda 
Myrcia apodocarpa 
Myrcia arachnicola 
Myrcia arborea 
Myrcia arcensis 
Myrcia arenaria 
Myrcia arenicola 
Myrcia areolata 
Myrcia ascendens 
Myrcia asperorum 
Myrcia atramentifera 
Myrcia atropilosa 
Myrcia atrorufa 
Myrcia attenuata 
Myrcia aurea 
Myrcia auriculata 
Myrcia auxotelica 
Myrcia azulensis 
Myrcia badia 
Myrcia banilejoana 
Myrcia baracoensis 
Myrcia barituensis 
Myrcia barkeri 
Myrcia bartlettii 
Myrcia basicordata 
Myrcia bella 
Myrcia bergiana 
Myrcia bergii 
Myrcia bialata 
Myrcia bicarinata 
Myrcia bicolor 
Myrcia biconvexa 
Myrcia billardiana 
Myrcia bipennis 
Myrcia biptera 
Myrcia blanchetiana 
Myrcia boanova 
Myrcia boldinghii 
Myrcia bolivarensis 
Myrcia bonnetiasylvestris 
Myrcia borhidii 
Myrcia botryophylla 
Myrcia bracteata 
Myrcia bracteosa 
Myrcia bredemeyeriana 
Myrcia breviflora 
Myrcia brevispicata 
Myrcia brunnea 
Myrcia buchenavioides 
Myrcia buxifolia 
Myrcia cacuminis 
Myrcia caesariata 
Myrcia calcicola 
Myrcia calderonii 
Myrcia caloneura 
Myrcia calophylla 
Myrcia calycampa 
Myrcia calyptrata 
Myrcia camapuanensis 
Myrcia cana 
Myrcia canaliculata 
Myrcia canapuensis 
Myrcia cancellata 
Myrcia cantana 
Myrcia capitata 
Myrcia carangola 
Myrcia cardiaca 
Myrcia cardiophylla 
Myrcia carinata 
Myrcia carioca 
Myrcia caroli 
Myrcia carvalhoi 
Myrcia castanea 
Myrcia cataphyllata 
Myrcia catharinensis 
Myrcia caudata 
Myrcia celaenensis 
Myrcia cerqueiria 
Myrcia chapadensis 
Myrcia chiapensis 
Myrcia chionantha 
Myrcia chonodisca 
Myrcia chrysophylloides 
Myrcia chytraculia 
Myrcia cionei 
Myrcia circulensis 
Myrcia circumdata 
Myrcia citrifolia 
Myrcia clarendonensis 
Myrcia clarensis 
Myrcia clausa 
Myrcia clavata 
Myrcia clavija 
Myrcia clementis 
Myrcia clusiifolia 
Myrcia coelosepala 
Myrcia colpodes 
Myrcia compacta 
Myrcia compactiflora 
Myrcia compta 
Myrcia concava 
Myrcia concinna 
Myrcia concisa 
Myrcia conduplicata 
Myrcia congestiflora 
Myrcia connata 
Myrcia contrerasii 
Myrcia convexivenia 
Myrcia cordiformis 
Myrcia cordiifolia 
Myrcia corticosa 
Myrcia costeira 
Myrcia coumete 
Myrcia crassa 
Myrcia crassimarginata 
Myrcia crebra 
Myrcia crispa 
Myrcia cristalensis 
Myrcia cujabensis 
Myrcia cuneifolia 
Myrcia cuprea 
Myrcia curassavica 
Myrcia curta 
Myrcia curtipendula 
Myrcia cuspidata 
Myrcia cymatophylla 
Myrcia cymosa 
Myrcia debilis 
Myrcia decandra 
Myrcia decorticans 
Myrcia deflexa 
Myrcia delicata 
Myrcia densa 
Myrcia densiflora 
Myrcia densifolia 
Myrcia depressa 
Myrcia dermatophylla 
Myrcia diaphana 
Myrcia diaz-piedrahitae 
Myrcia dichasialis 
Myrcia dichrophylla 
Myrcia directa 
Myrcia dispar 
Myrcia divisoria 
Myrcia dolichopetala 
Myrcia doniana 
Myrcia dryadica 
Myrcia egensis 
Myrcia ehrenbergiana 
Myrcia elattophylla 
Myrcia elevata 
Myrcia elliptifolia 
Myrcia enneantha 
Myrcia ensiformis 
Myrcia eriocalyx 
Myrcia eriocephala 
Myrcia eriopus 
Myrcia ermitensis 
Myrcia espiritosantensis 
Myrcia estoraquensis 
Myrcia estremerae 
Myrcia eugenioides 
Myrcia eugeniopsoides 
Myrcia eumecephylla 
Myrcia eveae 
Myrcia exapata 
Myrcia exasperata 
Myrcia excoriata 
Myrcia eximia 
Myrcia exploratoris 
Myrcia extranea 
Myrcia fasciata 
Myrcia fascicularis 
Myrcia fasciculata 
Myrcia fawcettii 
Myrcia federalis 
Myrcia felisbertii 
Myrcia fenestrata 
Myrcia fenzliana 
Myrcia ferruginea 
Myrcia ferruginosa 
Myrcia filibracteata 
Myrcia flagellaris 
Myrcia flavoviridis 
Myrcia florida 
Myrcia floridissima 
Myrcia foramina 
Myrcia fosteri 
Myrcia foveolata 
Myrcia fria 
Myrcia fusca 
Myrcia fusiformis 
Myrcia galanoana 
Myrcia garciae 
Myrcia gaudichaudiana 
Myrcia gentryi 
Myrcia gestasiana 
Myrcia gigantea 
Myrcia gigantifolia 
Myrcia gigas 
Myrcia gilsoniana 
Myrcia glabra 
Myrcia glabrescens 
Myrcia glauca 
Myrcia glazioviana 
Myrcia glaziovii 
Myrcia glomerata 
Myrcia gollmeriana 
Myrcia gomidesioides 
Myrcia gonini 
Myrcia govinha 
Myrcia goyazensis 
Myrcia graciliflora 
Myrcia gracilipes 
Myrcia grammica 
Myrcia grandifolia 
Myrcia grandis 
Myrcia grazielae 
Myrcia guarujana 
Myrcia guavira 
Myrcia guavira-mi 
Myrcia guayabillo 
Myrcia guedesiae 
Myrcia guianensis 
Myrcia guildingiana 
Myrcia gundlachii 
Myrcia haenkeana 
Myrcia hanoverensis 
Myrcia hartwegiana 
Myrcia hatschbachii 
Myrcia hebepetala 
Myrcia hedraiophylla 
Myrcia heliandina 
Myrcia heringii 
Myrcia hernandezii 
Myrcia heterochroa 
Myrcia heteroclada 
Myrcia hexasticha 
Myrcia hilariana 
Myrcia hintonii 
Myrcia hirtiflora 
Myrcia hispida 
Myrcia hoffmannseggii 
Myrcia holstii 
Myrcia hondurensis 
Myrcia hotteana 
Myrcia huallagae 
Myrcia hydrophila 
Myrcia hylobates 
Myrcia hypericoides 
Myrcia hypoleuca 
Myrcia hypophaea 
Myrcia icnii 
Myrcia imperfecta 
Myrcia inaequiloba 
Myrcia incompleta 
Myrcia inconspicua 
Myrcia induta 
Myrcia innovans 
Myrcia insigniflora 
Myrcia insignis 
Myrcia insularis 
Myrcia integra 
Myrcia intonsa 
Myrcia iranduba 
Myrcia irregularis 
Myrcia isaiana 
Myrcia ishoaquinicca 
Myrcia izabalana 
Myrcia javariana 
Myrcia jefensis 
Myrcia jimenoana 
Myrcia johnstonii 
Myrcia karlingii 
Myrcia karuaiensis 
Myrcia karwinskyana 
Myrcia killipii 
Myrcia krugii 
Myrcia krugioides 
Myrcia kylistophylla 
Myrcia lacerdaeana 
Myrcia lacunosa 
Myrcia laevis 
Myrcia landimiana 
Myrcia lanuginosa 
Myrcia lapidulosa 
Myrcia laricina 
Myrcia lascada 
Myrcia lasiantha 
Myrcia laxa 
Myrcia laxiflora 
Myrcia legrandii 
Myrcia lenheirensis 
Myrcia leonis 
Myrcia lepida 
Myrcia levisensis 
Myrcia liesneri 
Myrcia lignosa 
Myrcia ligustrina 
Myrcia lilloi 
Myrcia limoncillo 
Myrcia linearifolia 
Myrcia linearis 
Myrcia littoralis 
Myrcia lituatinervia 
Myrcia lojensis 
Myrcia lomensis 
Myrcia lonchophylla 
Myrcia longicalyptrata 
Myrcia longipaniculata 
Myrcia longiramea 
Myrcia longisepala 
Myrcia loranthifolia 
Myrcia lozanoi 
Myrcia lucasiae 
Myrcia lughadhae 
Myrcia luquillensis 
Myrcia luschnathiana 
Myrcia lutescens 
Myrcia macaca 
Myrcia macrantha 
Myrcia macrocalyx 
Myrcia macrocarpa 
Myrcia macucana 
Myrcia maculata 
Myrcia madida 
Myrcia maestrensis 
Myrcia magna 
Myrcia magnifolia 
Myrcia maguirei 
Myrcia majaguitana 
Myrcia manacalensis 
Myrcia manausensis 
Myrcia mansoniana 
Myrcia manuensis 
Myrcia maraana 
Myrcia margaretiae 
Myrcia marianae 
Myrcia maritima 
Myrcia marliereana 
Myrcia marmeladensis 
Myrcia martiusiana 
Myrcia martorellii 
Myrcia mathewsiana 
Myrcia matogrossensis 
Myrcia maxima 
Myrcia maximiliana 
Myrcia maxonii 
Myrcia mayana 
Myrcia mayarensis 
Myrcia mcvaughii 
Myrcia megapaniculata 
Myrcia megistophylla 
Myrcia melanophylla 
Myrcia melastomoides 
Myrcia meridensis 
Myrcia mesoamericana 
Myrcia micropetala 
Myrcia microphylla 
Myrcia microstachya 
Myrcia millspaughii 
Myrcia minutiflora 
Myrcia mirabilis 
Myrcia mischophylla 
Myrcia moaensis 
Myrcia moctezumae 
Myrcia mollis 
Myrcia monocarpa 
Myrcia monoclada 
Myrcia montana 
Myrcia monteverdensis 
Myrcia mornicola 
Myrcia morroqueimadensis 
Myrcia mucugensis 
Myrcia multiflora 
Myrcia multiglomerata 
Myrcia multipunctata 
Myrcia munizii 
Myrcia mutabilis 
Myrcia myrcioides 
Myrcia myriantha 
Myrcia myrtillifolia 
Myrcia nandu-apysa 
Myrcia neesiana 
Myrcia neoacunae 
Myrcia neoaequatoriensis 
Myrcia neoblanchetiana 
Myrcia neobracteata 
Myrcia neobuxifolia 
Myrcia neocambessedeana 
Myrcia neocapitata 
Myrcia neocaudata 
Myrcia neoclusiifolia 
Myrcia neocollina 
Myrcia neocuprea 
Myrcia neodimorpha 
Myrcia neodoniana 
Myrcia neoelegans 
Myrcia neoestrellensis 
Myrcia neoforsteri 
Myrcia neofusca 
Myrcia neoglabra 
Myrcia neograndis 
Myrcia neohernandezii 
Myrcia neohotteana 
Myrcia neoimperfecta 
Myrcia neoinvolucrata 
Myrcia neokiaerskovii 
Myrcia neolaevigata 
Myrcia neolitoralis 
Myrcia neolucida 
Myrcia neomacrocarpa 
Myrcia neomacrophylla 
Myrcia neomcvaughii 
Myrcia neomontana 
Myrcia neomyrcioides 
Myrcia neoobscura 
Myrcia neooreophila 
Myrcia neopalustris 
Myrcia neopauciflora 
Myrcia neopicardae 
Myrcia neoregeliana 
Myrcia neoriedeliana 
Myrcia neorostrata 
Myrcia neorubella 
Myrcia neosalicifolia 
Myrcia neoschomburgkiana 
Myrcia neosintenisii 
Myrcia neosmithii 
Myrcia neospeciosa 
Myrcia neospruceana 
Myrcia neosuaveolens 
Myrcia neothomasiana 
Myrcia neotovarensis 
Myrcia neovelutina 
Myrcia neovenulosa 
Myrcia neoverticillaris 
Myrcia neoyaquensis 
Myrcia nervata 
Myrcia nesiotica 
Myrcia neuwiedeana 
Myrcia nigricans 
Myrcia nipensis 
Myrcia nitida 
Myrcia nivea 
Myrcia nobilis 
Myrcia nodosa 
Myrcia nubicola 
Myrcia nummularia 
Myrcia oblanceolata 
Myrcia oblongata 
Myrcia oblongifolia 
Myrcia obovata 
Myrcia obumbrans 
Myrcia obversa 
Myrcia occulta 
Myrcia ochraciflora 
Myrcia ochroides 
Myrcia oligantha 
Myrcia oligostemon 
Myrcia oreophila 
Myrcia otocalyx 
Myrcia ottonis 
Myrcia ouropretoensis 
Myrcia ovata 
Myrcia ovina 
Myrcia ovoidea 
Myrcia paivae 
Myrcia palustris 
Myrcia panamensis 
Myrcia panicularis 
Myrcia paradoxa 
Myrcia parca 
Myrcia parviantha 
Myrcia parvifolia 
Myrcia paucantha 
Myrcia paulii-jonesii 
Myrcia paxillata 
Myrcia peduncularis 
Myrcia pendens 
Myrcia pendula 
Myrcia peninsularis 
Myrcia pentagona 
Myrcia perforata 
Myrcia perlaevigata 
Myrcia pertusa 
Myrcia petenensis 
Myrcia petricola 
Myrcia petrophila 
Myrcia picachoana 
Myrcia picardae 
Myrcia pileata 
Myrcia pineticola 
Myrcia pinetorum 
Myrcia pinifolia 
Myrcia piptocalyx 
Myrcia pistrinalis 
Myrcia pitoniana 
Myrcia pittieri 
Myrcia platycaula 
Myrcia platyclada 
Myrcia platyphylla 
Myrcia plicata 
Myrcia plusiantha 
Myrcia pocsiana 
Myrcia poeppigiana 
Myrcia polyantha 
Myrcia polygama 
Myrcia polyneura 
Myrcia polysticta 
Myrcia popayanensis 
Myrcia porphyrea 
Myrcia portoricensis 
Myrcia pozasiana 
Myrcia prismatica 
Myrcia proctorii 
Myrcia proencana 
Myrcia prolaxa 
Myrcia protracta 
Myrcia psammophila 
Myrcia pseudoapoda 
Myrcia pseudobrunneica 
Myrcia pseudomarlierea 
Myrcia pseudomoaensis 
Myrcia pseudopauciflora 
Myrcia pseudospectabilis 
Myrcia pseudosplendens 
Myrcia pseudovenulosa 
Myrcia psilophylla 
Myrcia ptariensis 
Myrcia pteropoda 
Myrcia pubescens 
Myrcia pubiflora 
Myrcia pubipetala 
Myrcia pudica 
Myrcia pulchella 
Myrcia pullei 
Myrcia pulvinata 
Myrcia pyrifolia 
Myrcia quitarensis 
Myrcia racemosa 
Myrcia racemulosa 
Myrcia ramageana 
Myrcia ramiflora 
Myrcia raminfinita 
Myrcia ramuliflora 
Myrcia regnelliana 
Myrcia reitzii 
Myrcia restingae 
Myrcia resupinata 
Myrcia reticulata 
Myrcia reticulosa 
Myrcia retivenia 
Myrcia retorta 
Myrcia retusa 
Myrcia revolutifolia 
Myrcia rhodophylla 
Myrcia riodocensis 
Myrcia riverae 
Myrcia robusta 
Myrcia rogersiana 
Myrcia rosangelae 
Myrcia rotundata 
Myrcia rubiginosa 
Myrcia rufipes 
Myrcia rufipila 
Myrcia rufopilosa 
Myrcia rufotomentosa 
Myrcia rugosior 
Myrcia ruiziana 
Myrcia rupestris 
Myrcia rupicola 
Myrcia rupta 
Myrcia ruschii 
Myrcia salamensis 
Myrcia saliana 
Myrcia salicifolia 
Myrcia salticola 
Myrcia salzmannii 
Myrcia samuelssonii 
Myrcia sanisidrensis 
Myrcia santalucia 
Myrcia santateresana 
Myrcia saxatilis 
Myrcia schlechtendaliana 
Myrcia schottiana 
Myrcia schottii 
Myrcia scoparia 
Myrcia scytophylla 
Myrcia selleana 
Myrcia selloi 
Myrcia sericea 
Myrcia serrana 
Myrcia servata 
Myrcia sessiliflora 
Myrcia sessilis 
Myrcia sessilissima 
Myrcia siberiensis 
Myrcia simulata 
Myrcia sintenisiana 
Myrcia sipapensis 
Myrcia skeldingii 
Myrcia skortzoviana 
Myrcia solitaria 
Myrcia sordida 
Myrcia sororopanensis 
Myrcia sparsiflora 
Myrcia spathulifolia 
Myrcia speciosa 
Myrcia spectabilis 
Myrcia spicata 
Myrcia spinifolia 
Myrcia splendens 
Myrcia sporadosticta 
Myrcia sprengeliana 
Myrcia springiana 
Myrcia squamata 
Myrcia stenocarpa 
Myrcia stenocymbia 
Myrcia stewartiana 
Myrcia sticta 
Myrcia stictophylla 
Myrcia stigmatosa 
Myrcia straminea 
Myrcia stricta 
Myrcia strigipes 
Myrcia strigosa 
Myrcia styphelantha 
Myrcia subacuminata 
Myrcia subalpestris 
Myrcia subavenia 
Myrcia subcapitata 
Myrcia subcordata 
Myrcia subcordifolia 
Myrcia suberosa 
Myrcia subglabra 
Myrcia subobliqua 
Myrcia suborbicularis 
Myrcia subsericea 
Myrcia subsessilis 
Myrcia subterminalis 
Myrcia subulata 
Myrcia sucrei 
Myrcia suffruticosa 
Myrcia summa 
Myrcia susannae 
Myrcia sylvatica 
Myrcia symmetrica 
Myrcia tafelbergica 
Myrcia tarauacana 
Myrcia teimosa 
Myrcia tenuiclada 
Myrcia tenuifolia 
Myrcia tenuipes 
Myrcia tenuivenosa 
Myrcia tepuiensis 
Myrcia teresensis 
Myrcia terniflora 
Myrcia tessmannii 
Myrcia tetraloba 
Myrcia tetraphylla 
Myrcia tetraptera 
Myrcia teuscheriana 
Myrcia thomasiana 
Myrcia thomasii 
Myrcia thyrsoidea 
Myrcia tiburoniana 
Myrcia tijucensis 
Myrcia toaensis 
Myrcia tomentosa 
Myrcia tonii 
Myrcia torta 
Myrcia tortuosa 
Myrcia tovarensis 
Myrcia tresantha 
Myrcia trichantha 
Myrcia tricona 
Myrcia tridymantha 
Myrcia trimera 
Myrcia truncata 
Myrcia tumida 
Myrcia tumidonodia 
Myrcia tussaciana 
Myrcia tylophylla 
Myrcia tytthoflora 
Myrcia uaioai 
Myrcia ubatubana 
Myrcia uberavensis 
Myrcia umbelliformis 
Myrcia umbraticola 
Myrcia unana 
Myrcia uncinata 
Myrcia undulata 
Myrcia uniflora 
Myrcia urbaniana 
Myrcia valenzuelana 
Myrcia variabilis 
Myrcia vattimoi 
Myrcia vauthiereana 
Myrcia velloziana 
Myrcia vellozoi 
Myrcia velutiflora 
Myrcia venosissima 
Myrcia ventuarensis 
Myrcia venulosa 
Myrcia verrucosa 
Myrcia verticillaris 
Myrcia verticillata 
Myrcia vestita 
Myrcia vexata 
Myrcia virgata 
Myrcia vittoriana 
Myrcia warmingiana 
Myrcia websteri 
Myrcia wilsonii 
Myrcia woodburyi 
Myrcia xylopioides 
Myrcia yaraensis 
Myrcia yasuniana 
Myrcia zanquinensis 
Myrcia zetekiana 
Myrcia zuzygium

References

Myrcia